Cubatyphlops is a genus of snakes in the family Typhlopidae.

Distribution
The 12 species of the genus Cubatyphlops are found mostly on Cuba, but also occur on other Caribbean islands.

Species
The following species are recognized as being valid.
Cubatyphlops anchaurus 
Cubatyphlops anousius 
Cubatyphlops arator 
Cubatyphlops biminiensis 
Cubatyphlops caymanensis 
Cubatyphlops contorhinus 
Cubatyphlops epactius 
Cubatyphlops golyathi 
Cubatyphlops notorachius 
Cubatyphlops paradoxus 
Cubatyphlops perimychus 
Cubatyphlops satelles 

Nota bene: A binomial authority in parentheses indicates that the species was originally described in a genus other than Cubatyphlops.

References

Further reading
Hedges SB, Marion AB, Lipp KM, Marin J, Vidal N (2014). "A taxonomic framework for typhlopid snakes from the Caribbean and other regions (Reptilia, Squamata)". Caribbean Herpetology 49: 1-61. (Cubatyphlops, new genus, p. 46).
Thomas R, Hedges SB (2007). "Eleven new species of snakes of the genus Typhlops (Serpentes: Typhlopidae) from Hispaniola and Cuba". Zootaxa 1400: 1-26.

 
Snake genera